Sydney Kai Kamlager-Dove (born July 20, 1972) is an American politician serving as the U.S. representative for California's 37th congressional district since 2023. A Democrat, she previously served in the California State Senate, representing the 30th district. She has also served in the California State Assembly and as a trustee for the Los Angeles Community College District.

Early life and education
Sydney Kamlager-Dove was born in Chicago, Illinois. She attended the University of Southern California in Los Angeles, where she earned a Bachelor of Arts in political science. She is a member of the Zeta Phi Beta sorority. She received her Master's in arts management from the Heinz College at Carnegie Mellon University. Her mother is actress Cheryl Lynn Bruce and her stepfather is artist Kerry James Marshall.

Career
In 1996, Kamlager-Dove was the spokesperson for the Social and Public Art Resource Center (SPARC) in Venice, California. A year later, she was the organization's public art director during the restoration of the Venice graffiti pit. After leaving SPARC, Kamlager-Dove worked as an assistant to actor Delroy Lindo. She later worked as a public affairs director for the nonprofit child care corporation Crystal Stairs, headed at the time by Holly Mitchell.

In 2010, Kamlager-Dove worked on the campaign to elect Mitchell to the California State Assembly, becoming district director after Mitchell's victory. In 2015, she ran for Seat 3 of the board of trustees for the Los Angeles Community College District. She won with more than 52% of the vote among four candidates on March 3, 2015. Kamlager-Dove has sat on the board of Planned Parenthood Los Angeles.

California State Assembly (2018–2021) 
After Sebastian Ridley-Thomas announced his resignation from the State Assembly on December 27, 2017, Kamlager entered the race to serve the remainder of his term. She won the April 3, 2018, special election to represent California's 54th State Assembly district.

Kamlager was an advocate for racial equity, access and social justice in the California State Assembly. She was vocal about restoring voting rights to parolees, strengthening standards for police use of force, and stopping the NCAA from preventing student athletes from receiving payment in connection with the use of the student athlete's name, image or likeness. In 2019, she co-authored SB 188, the CROWN Act, which prohibits employers from enforcing policies surrounding "race-neutral" grooming or discriminating against people wearing natural or protective hairstyles.

During her tenure in the Assembly, Kamlager-Dove sat on the following standing committees: Public Safety, Arts and Entertainment, Communications and Conveyance, Insurance and the powerful Rules committee. She chaired the Select Committee on Incarcerated Women and led the legislature's Los Angeles County Delegation. In 2020, Kamlager-Dove was appointed by the Speaker of the California State Assembly to serve on the Committee on Revision of the Penal Code.

Legislation

Fiscal issues 
Kamlager-Dove sponsored AB 987, legislation to build a new arena for the Los Angeles Clippers. The bill was signed into law.

Social issues 
Kamlager-Dove sponsored two bills, AB 241 and AB 242, to mandate the incorporation of implicit bias training into continued education for healthcare professionals, lawyers, and judges. The bills were intended to reduce disparities in health care and the judicial system in California.

Kamlager-Dove sponsored California's first hunting ban in decades with AB 1254, which ends the trophy hunting of bobcats, except under specified circumstances, until January 1, 2025.

California State Senate (2021–2023) 

On November 10, 2020, Kamlager-Dove announced her candidacy for the California State Senate to succeed Holly Mitchell, who was elected to the Los Angeles County Board of Supervisors. On March 2, 2021, Kamlager-Dove was elected to the California State Senate with 67.67% of the vote.

U.S. House of Representatives

Elections

2022 

In November 2022, Kamlager-Dove was elected to the U.S. House of Representatives for California's 37th district, replacing Karen Bass, who successfully ran for mayor of Los Angeles.

Caucus memberships 

 Congressional Progressive Caucus
 Congressional Black Caucus

Committee assignments 

 Committee on Natural Resources
 Committee on Foreign Affairs

Electoral history

2018 California State Assembly election

2020 California State Assembly election

References

External links 

 Congresswoman Sydney Kamlager-Dove official legislative website 
 Sydney Kamlager for Congress campaign website
 
 

|-

|-

|-

1972 births
21st-century American politicians
African-American members of the United States House of Representatives
African-American state legislators in California
Appropriations Committee member, California State Senate
Democratic Party California state senators
Democratic Party members of the California State Assembly
Democratic Party members of the United States House of Representatives from California
Female members of the United States House of Representatives
Heinz College of Information Systems and Public Policy alumni
Living people
People from Chicago
People from Los Angeles
Politicians from Los Angeles
University of Southern California alumni
Women state legislators in California